The Beatles: 50th Anniversary Edition is an expanded reissue of the 1968 double album The Beatles (also known as the "White Album") by the English rock band the Beatles. It was released in November 2018 to coincide with the 50th anniversary of the original album. It includes a new stereo remix of the album by Giles Martin, the son of Beatles producer George Martin who had died in 2016.

Background and content 
The remixed and expanded editions of The Beatles were released on 9 November 2018. These sets feature 50 previously unreleased recordings of songs from the album, in addition to the Esher demos recorded at Harrison's house. The four editions are a three-CD deluxe set, containing the original double album and one CD of Esher demos; a seven-disc super deluxe edition, which adds three CDs of outtakes and a Blu-ray disc; a two-LP edition, comprising the original release; and a four-LP edition, two discs of which contain Esher demos. Following the announcement of these editions in September, a preview containing three versions of "Back in the U.S.S.R." was released on Spotify and iTunes.

Reception 
Jordan Orlando of The New Yorker writes that the 2018 remix "reveals what might be called the greatest record ever made, not only in terms of its innovation and its strange, impenetrable, endlessly suggestive beauty but also because of its place at the apex of the Beatles’ career and its role as an aesthetic keystone for nearly all the rock-and-roll recordings that have followed". He additionally comments that "Rebuilt digitally, the album’s enormous soundscape is finally complete: the progressive generational muddiness is gone, revealing the dry snap of Ringo’s snare and Harrison’s full-throated gentle weeping and the thunderous effervescence of McCartney’s bass runs and Lennon’s halting intakes of breath."

On Metacritic, the super deluxe edition receives an aggregate score of 100/100, based on 11 reviews – which the website defines as indicating "universal acclaim".

Track listings

Remix of original album

50th Anniversary Edition bonus tracks

Personnel 

 Giles Martin – mixing supervisor

Weekly charts 

2018 weekly chart performance

References 

2018 compilation albums
The Beatles compilation albums
Albums produced by George Martin
Reissue albums